Caleb Frostman (born November 22, 1984) is an American politician from the state of Wisconsin. He was Secretary of the Wisconsin Department of Workforce Development in the administration of Governor Tony Evers from 2019 until his resignation on September 18, 2020. A Democrat, he previously served as a member of the Wisconsin State Senate representing the 1st district.

Biography
Frostman is a native of Green Bay, Wisconsin. He worked for banks in the Minneapolis–Saint Paul area and moved to Sturgeon Bay, Wisconsin, in 2016, where he worked for the Door County Economic Development Corporation as their executive director. After Lasee, a Republican, resigned his seat in the Wisconsin Senate, Frostman resigned from his job to run in the special election to fill the vacancy. On June 12, Frostman defeated André Jacque to win the seat. He was sworn in on June 28, 2018. He was later defeated by Jacque in November 2018, losing the chance of being elected for a full four-year term. Governor Tony Evers appointed him as Secretary of the Wisconsin Department of Workforce Development, though he remained secretary-designee until the Republican-controlled Wisconsin Senate approved his appointment at the start of 2020.

On September 18, 2020, Evers asked for Frostman's resignation, due to long-term issues involving the approval of payment of benefits to applicants during the COVID-19 pandemic which dated back to before the state's first stay-at-home order. Frostman tendered his resignation soon after.

Electoral history

| colspan="6" style="text-align:center;background-color: #e9e9e9;"| General Election, June 12, 2018

| colspan="6" style="text-align:center;background-color: #e9e9e9;"| General Election, November 6, 2018

References

External links

Living people
Politicians from Green Bay, Wisconsin
State cabinet secretaries of Wisconsin
Democratic Party Wisconsin state senators
Wisconsin School of Business alumni
1984 births